"When I'm Gone" is a song by Swedish DJ Alesso and American singer Katy Perry, released on 29 December 2021 by 10:22 PM Records, coinciding with the first date of Play—Perry's Las Vegas concert residency. The song is a EDM, dance-pop, house and electropop tune, written by Perry, Alesso, Alida Garpestad Peck, Rami Yacoub, Nathan Cunningham, Marc Sibley, and Alma Goodman, and produced by Alesso and the Space Primates.

"When I'm Gone" was released alongside a music video that was directed by Hannah Lux Davis, and choreographed by Sean Bankhead. The song reached number one in Croatia and has also entered the top 10 in Bulgaria, the Czech Republic, Russia, and Slovakia as well as the top 20 in Lebanon, the Netherlands, and Poland, and the top 30 in Belgium and Hungary. The single was the third-bestselling song of 2022 in Croatia. Perry performed the track as a medley with "Walking on Air" (2013) at Play, during CNN's New Year's Eve Live. The official music video premiered on 10 January 2022 on ESPN during the halftime show of the 2022 College Football Playoff National Championship.

Release and promotion
On 15 December 2021, Alesso and Perry announced the song and released a small snippet of the song and music video via their social media accounts. The song was released on 29 December 2021, the same day that Perry began her residency show Play. The song appears on the setlist of her 2021-2022 Las Vegas Residency, Play, at Resorts World Las Vegas. It is performed with her song "Walking on Air" (from her 2013 album, Prism). On 31 December 2021, her performance of the song (from her residency) was also included as a part of the CNN's New Year's Eve Live special. On 29 January 2022, Perry also performed the song on Saturday Night Live, introduced by Willem Dafoe.

Composition
"When I'm Gone" is a dance-pop, house, and electropop song that runs for 2 minutes and 41 seconds. Alesso said: "I feel like a song like this hasn't been made in a while. The world needs a fun energetic dance record again. We worked on this song for more than a year and are so pleased with how it came out."

Critical response
Justin Curto from Vulture wrote "When I'm Gone" is "another EDM bop" that is similar to Perry's 2019 single "Never Really Over" in cadence and rhythm. 360 said the song blends "high-tech" beats with heartbreaking lyrics, and complimented Alesso's production. Official Charts Company gave a positive review and wrote: "Over a thumping house-beat, Katy says she's 'going to give them everything that they want', and this high-tempo banger will certainly win over a huge swathe of pop fans."

Commercial performance

In the United States, "When I'm Gone" charted in the Bubbling Under Hot 100, before debuting on the primary Billboard Hot 100 chart at number 97 in the week dated 22 February 2022, becoming Perry's 35th entry and Alesso's third on the chart. It peaked at number 90. "When I'm Gone" also debuted at number four on Dance/Electronic Digital Song Sales and number 17 on the overall Hot Dance/Electronic Songs list.

In the United Kingdom, "When I'm Gone" debuted at number 72 on Official Singles Chart as the sixth highest new-entry of the week. It rose to number 49 in its eighth week on the chart, and further peaked at number 27 on both the UK Official Singles Sales Chart Top 100 and Downloads Chart Top 100 charts. In Canada, "When I'm Gone" debuted at number 54 on Canadian Hot 100, as her 38th career entry on the chart. It also debuted at number seven on the Canadian Digital Songs Sales chart.

Music video
The accompanying music video premiered 10 January 2022 on ESPN, during halftime of the 2022 College Football Playoff National Championship; it was the first music video to debut during a live event on ESPN. The video features a Boston Dynamics robot named "Spot" which in the video Perry named "Nugget" after her own personal dog.

Perry describes it as her first full blown choreography video due to the "sexy" production of the song. The video was choreographed by Sean Bankhead, and was directed by Hannah Lux Davis. According to Perry it was shot at an active working Budweiser brewery. Davis said: "We were going for something that was more Black Mirror. Slightly futuristic, but we still wanted it to feel grounded. Tech sci-fi but make it pop." Perry wears a custom Dolce & Gabbana purple jumpsuit in the video, describing it as her "favorite outfit". People called it "mesmerising", further saying: "In true Perry style, the video features some stunning costumes and impressive dance moves."

Track listing
Digital download and streaming
"When I'm Gone" – 2:41
Digital download (VIP mix)
"When I'm Gone" (VIP mix) – 2:51
Streaming (VIP mix)
"When I'm Gone" (VIP mix) – 2:51
"When I'm Gone" – 2:41

Charts

Weekly charts

Monthly charts

Year-end charts

Certifications

Release history

References

2021 singles
2021 songs
Alesso songs
Katy Perry songs
Music videos directed by Hannah Lux Davis
Songs written by Alesso
Songs written by Katy Perry
Songs written by Rami Yacoub
Song recordings produced by Alesso